Eudyops is a genus of moths of the family Erebidae. The genus was erected by George Hampson in 1926.

Species
Eudyops diascia Hampson, 1926
Eudyops telmela Schaus, 1911
Eudyops xantholepis Dyar, 1912

References

Calpinae